Table tennis was contested at the 2013 Summer Universiade from July 7 to 15 at the Sport Palace in Kazan, Russia. Men's and women's singles, men's and women's team, and men's, women's, and mixed doubles events was contested.

Medal summary

Medal table

Medal events

References

External links
2013 Summer Universiade – Table tennis
Results book

2013
2013 in table tennis
2013 Summer Universiade events